Ranieri Campello (born 5 October 1962) is an Italian equestrian. He competed at the 1988 Summer Olympics and the 1996 Summer Olympics.

References

1962 births
Living people
Italian male equestrians
Olympic equestrians of Italy
Equestrians at the 1988 Summer Olympics
Equestrians at the 1996 Summer Olympics
Sportspeople from Rome